Treasure Hunt is a 2003 American film directed by Jim Wynorski and starring Melissa Brasselle and Richard Gabai.

While making the film in Hawaii Wynorski took three of the actors to a secluded waterfall  location on their day off and shot what would become the first segment of Curse of the Komodo.

References

External links

2003 films
Films directed by Jim Wynorski
2000s English-language films
American comedy films
2000s American films